At the 1989 Summer Universiade, the athletics events were held at the Wedaustadion in Duisburg in West Germany from August 22–30. A total of 42 events were contested, of which 23 by male and 19 by female athletes.

Medal summary

Men

Women

Medal table

References

 
1989
Universiade
1989 Summer Universiade
1989 Universiade